Wagner Creek may refer to:

Wagner Creek (Florida), a stream in Florida
Wagner Creek (Bear Creek tributary), a stream in Oregon